Bronco Buster is a 1920 statue by Alexander Phimister Proctor, installed in Denver, Colorado, United States.

References

External links

 

1920 sculptures
Equestrian statues in Denver
Outdoor sculptures in Denver
Sculptures by Alexander Phimister Proctor
Sculptures of men in Colorado